Alto Ramirez (Spanish for Upper Ramírez) is a Chilean village located in Pichilemu, Cardenal Caro Province.

Populated places in Pichilemu